Fred Gaines Campbell (August 8, 1920 – December 3, 2008) was an American professional basketball player and coach as well as minor league baseball player. He played in the National Basketball League for the Detroit Gems and Detroit Vagabond Kings. While playing for the Gems he served as the head coach during the second half of the season after coach Joel Mason resigned. In many seasons with the Vagabond Kings, except for the only one in which the franchise played in the NBL (the rest of the years they were independent), Campbell also served as a player-coach. In two seasons as an NBL player, Campbell averaged 5.8 points per game.

In baseball, he played for a number of minor league teams in New York and Texas.

References 

1920 births
2008 deaths
American men's basketball players
Austin Pioneers players
Basketball players from Indiana
Guards (basketball)
Detroit Gems coaches
Detroit Gems players
Detroit Vagabond Kings coaches
Detroit Vagabond Kings players
Elmira Pioneers players
Gloversville-Johnstown Glovers players
Griffin Pimientos players
Player-coaches
San Antonio Missions players
Southern Illinois Salukis men's basketball players
Basketball players from Austin, Texas